Anna Aleksandrova Klochkova (born 1 November 1929) is a Soviet hurdler. She competed in the women's 80 metres hurdles at the 1952 Summer Olympics.

References

External links
 

1929 births
Possibly living people
Athletes (track and field) at the 1952 Summer Olympics
Soviet female hurdlers
Olympic athletes of the Soviet Union
Place of birth missing (living people)